Paula Badosa defeated Victoria Azarenka in the final, 7–6(7–5), 2–6, 7–6(7–2), to win the women's singles tennis title at the 2021 Indian Wells Masters. At three hours and four minutes, the final was the longest women's final contested at Indian Wells. By winning the title, Badosa became the first Spanish woman to win the tournament. This was her first WTA 1000 title and her second career WTA singles title overall. Azarenka was aiming to become the first woman to win the title at Indian Wells three times.

Bianca Andreescu was the defending champion from when the tournament was last held in 2019, but she was defeated in the third round by Anett Kontaveit. Two-time former champion Kim Clijsters made her return to the event for the first time since 2011. She lost in the first round to Kateřina Siniaková. Lucky loser Beatriz Haddad Maia became the first female Brazilian woman to defeat a player ranked in the world's top three after she defeated world No. 3 and top seed Karolína Plíšková in the third round. By reaching the semifinals, Ons Jabeur became the first Arab and Tunisian player to make a debut in the top 10 after the tournament.

Seeds
All seeds receive a bye into the second round.

Draw

Finals

Top half

Section 1

Section 2

Section 3

Section 4

Bottom half

Section 5

Section 6

Section 7

Section 8

Qualifying

Seeds

Qualifiers

Lucky losers

Qualifying draw

First qualifier

Second qualifier

Third qualifier

Fourth qualifier

Fifth qualifier

Sixth qualifier

Seventh qualifier

Eighth qualifier

Ninth qualifier

Tenth qualifier

Eleventh qualifier

Twelfth qualifier

References

External links
 Main draw
 Qualifying draw

Women's Singles